Jungle Records is a British independent record label formed in 1982, specialising in punk rock, post punk, gothic and alternative releases.

From 1982 to 1986 they were also active as a record distributor and were associate members of the Cartel, holding the exclusive right to sell not just the Cartel's but all indie records to the Our Price Records chain, including by Depeche Mode, New Order and The Smiths.

They recorded albums by Johnny Thunders such as Copy Cats (with Patti Palladin) and Que Sera Sera and control the Johnny Thunders & The Heartbreakers tape library, including their L.A.M.F. album.

They discovered and released the first recordings by Mercury Rev: Yerself Is Steam and Car Wash Hair, and also the first recordings by Fields of the Nephilim, Burning The Fields.

They are licensors of the French label Skydog Records, including Iggy & the Stooges' notorious 'Metallic KO', numerous other Iggy Pop releases, and albums by Flamin' Groovies, MC5, Kim Fowley, New York Dolls, amongst others.

They have also released recordings by Alternative TV, Sid Vicious, Sky Saxon, The Seeds, The Newtown Neurotics, Jimi Hendrix, Play Dead, The March Violets, UK Subs, King Kurt, The Adicts, Broken Bones, Sigue Sigue Sputnik, A Popular History Of Signs, Test Dept, Nina Simone, Family Fodder, Christian Death, The Eden House, Specimen, The Slits, Jayne County, Wendy James, Tyla Gang, Wasted Youth, Cuddly Toys, London Cowboys, Ducks Deluxe, ex-Spacemen 3 Sterling Roswell, ex-Dr. Feelgood guitarist & songwriter Wilko Johnson, NFD, Walter Lure's The Waldos, The Hillbilly Moon Explosion, Creaming Jesus and many others.

On their sub-label imprint Goldtop Recordings in collaboration with Goldtop Studio, they've released albums by Geraint Watkins, Martin Belmont, Boyd & Wain and Hillbilly Moon Explosion.

Other labels that they own or administer include Fall Out Records, Ministry Of Power, Fresh Records, Red Records, Mint Films and Middle Earth.

They are also a music publisher, trading as Jungle Music, and publish over a quarter of their music catalogue. As a book publisher, they issued Johnny Thunders...In Cold Blood by Nina Antonia in 1987. In 2014 they co-produced a film, Looking For Johnny: The Legend of Johnny Thunders, directed by Danny Garcia.

See also
 List of record labels

References

External links
 Official site

Record labels established in 1982
British independent record labels
Punk record labels
1982 establishments in the United Kingdom